Admiral Keppel may refer to:

 Augustus Keppel, 1st Viscount Keppel (1725-1786), British; also politician
 Colin Richard Keppel (1862–1947), British
 Henry Keppel (1809-1904), British